Michael George Karakas (November 13, 1910 – May 2, 1992) was an American professional ice hockey goaltender in the National Hockey League (NHL). He was the league's first American-born and -trained goaltender and the first player of Greek descent. Karakas played six full seasons and parts of two others with the Chicago Black Hawks and appeared in two Stanley Cup Finals, winning once. In 1938, he led Chicago, who had a .411 winning percentage in the regular season, to a second Stanley Cup, playing with a steel-toed boot on one foot in the last two games of the Finals after he had broken it in the last game of the Semi-finals. Karakas is one of the original members of the United States Hockey Hall of Fame.

Biography
Born in Aurora, Minnesota, to a Greek American family, he grew up in nearby Eveleth. Growing up, Karakas and Frank Brimsek, who also became a goaltender in the NHL, were battery mates for their high school baseball team, with Karakas catching.

Karakas played 8 seasons for the Chicago Black Hawks between 1936 and 1945. In his first season with the Black Hawks, Karakas was awarded the Calder Memorial Trophy after posting a 1.85 goals-against-average with nine shutouts in 48 games. Karakas was only invited to play for the Black Hawks because their regular goaltender, Lorne Chabot, was injured. After posting four wins in four games, with three shutouts, the Black Hawks made Karakas their starting goaltender; Chabot was later traded to the Montreal Maroons.

Karakas won the Stanley Cup in the 1937–38 season, playing for the first out of two teams which won the Cup with a losing record. For the 1937-38 Chicago Black Hawks season, their owner, Major Frederic McLaughlin, ordered his general manager to "ice [him] a team of all American players." After losing five of its six first games with an all-American roster, some Canadian players were added; however, the team finished the season with a 14–25–9 record for a .411 winning percentage.

In the playoffs, Karakas suffered a broken toe just before the start of the Stanley Cup final against the Toronto Maple Leafs. The Black Hawks were forced to substitute Alfie Moore for Karakas in the first game. After the first game, Moore was ruled ineligible, and the Black Hawks lost the next game. Karakas returned with a steel-toed boot and won the next two games, leading the Black Hawks to their second Stanley Cup win. Overall in that playoff run, Karakas had a 6–2 record, with two shutouts and a 1.71 goals-against-average.  Karakas also surrendered an overtime goal clinching a Stanley Cup by Toe Blake in the 1944 Stanley Cup Finals.

After helping Chicago win the Stanley Cup in 1938, Karakas asked the team's owners for a US$500 raise. The owners refused the raise, and for the next five seasons Karakas played three full seasons in the American Hockey League (AHL), and split two between the AHL and the NHL.

Karakas had 28 shutouts in the regular season, and another three in the playoffs in his six seasons in the NHL. In 5 of his  8 seasons in chicago Karakas appeared in all 48 games. in 38-39 he played 17 games with chicago + 5 with montreal.  In 1973, Karakas was named as an original member of the United States Hockey Hall of Fame, located in his hometown of Eveleth.

Personal life
Mike's younger brother Tommy played college hockey at Illinois, winning a championship in 1943.

Awards and achievements
Selected to the AHA First All-Star Team in 1935.
Calder Memorial Trophy winner in 1936.
Stanley Cup champion in 1938.
Calder Cup champion in 1940.
Selected to the AHL First All-Star Team in 1941.
Selected to the AHL Second All-Star Team in 1943.
Selected to the NHL Second All-Star Team in 1945.
Inducted into the United States Hockey Hall of Fame in 1973.

Career statistics

Regular season and playoffs

References

External links

1910 births
1992 deaths
American men's ice hockey goaltenders
American people of Greek descent
Calder Trophy winners
Chicago Blackhawks players
Chicago Shamrocks players
Ice hockey players from Minnesota
Montreal Canadiens players
New Haven Eagles players
People from Aurora, Minnesota
Providence Reds players
St. Louis Flyers (AHA) players
Springfield Indians players
Sportspeople from Eveleth, Minnesota
Stanley Cup champions
Tulsa Oilers (AHA) players
United States Hockey Hall of Fame inductees